Roh Su-hui is a South Korean political activist who was arrested in 2012 for breaking the National Security Act.

Biography 
Roh is the vice-chairman of the South Headquarters of the Pan-national Alliance for Korea's Reunification (Pomminryon). He was described by NBC News as "a leader of a South Korean group that has maintained friendly ties with North Korean groups".

Arrest 
Roh was arrested in July 2012 after he returned from an unauthorized visit to North Korea, via the Joint Security Area (JSA) in Panmunjom, where he called for the reunification of the two Koreas and bitterly criticized President Lee Myung-bak of South Korea for his hard-line North Korea policy. At the JSA, he was sent off by a large group of North Korean civilians waving the flag of reunified Korea and carrying bouquets of flowers. Associated Press film footage of the event showed Ro's approach to the border-line while a large group of South Korean security officials, South Korean Army personnel assigned to the Joint Security Area (JSA) and military policemen already awaiting his crossing in preparation for his arrest. Mere moments after crossing the border into South Korea, he was immediately seized and carried away (he had struggled against his captors), while the by-now furious North Koreans behind the border hurled insults at and fiercely protested the action. No North Korean border guards present intervened. He had entered North Korea via China in March for a memorial service marking the 100th day since the death of ruler Kim Jong-il. In February 2013, he was sentenced to four years in prison, and the Seoul Central District Court also ordered that his rights, such as suffrage, be stripped for three years after his release from prison. He was released from prison in July 2016.

The court ruling said "stern punishment is inevitable because [Ro] made a secret visit to North Korea without permission". Another activist, Won Jin-wook, received a three-year prison sentence for communicating with North Korean officials to arrange Ro's trip.

Reactions 
The arrest of Roh was described by American-based NK News as "a clear but unnecessary propaganda victory" for North Korea. An article in The Guardian mused: "The arrest made a very small splash in the western media, which comes as little surprise because a story with a warm North and a cold South doesn't square easily with the message that has been delivered by media outlets in Europe and the US for the last two decades."

North Korea's state news agency said the "arrest has pushed the people in the Democratic People's Republic of Korea [North Korea] into fury" and described it as an abuse of human rights.

See also 
 Korean reunification

Notes

References

External links 
 
 South Korean activist No Su-hui arrested as he returns from unauthorised trip to the North, AP News (YouTube)

Left-wing nationalism in South Korea
Living people
South Korean human rights activists
South Korean anti-war activists
Year of birth missing (living people)